Roberto Alonso Arciga Romero (born 3 February 1992) is a Mexican footballer who plays as a goalkeeper. He is currently a free agent.

Career
Arciga's first senior club was Monarcas Morelia, with whom he also spent time with during his youth career. He made his professional debut while on load at Toros Neza during the Apertura 2012 Copa MX on 8 August 2012.

References

1992 births
Living people
Footballers from Michoacán
Mexican footballers
People from Apatzingán
Association football goalkeepers
Atlético Morelia players
Toros Neza footballers